USS Terrier has been the name of more than one United States Navy ship, and may refer to:

, a schooner in commission from 1823 to 1825
, a patrol boat in commission from 1917 to 1919

Terrier